Francisella piscicida is a bacterium present in  Atlantic cod. It is the causative agent of francisellosis, a serious disease present in Norwegian cod farming.

References

Thiotrichales
Bacteria described in 2008